Pirahã (also spelled Pirahá, Pirahán), or Múra-Pirahã, is the indigenous language of the isolated Pirahã people of Amazonas, Brazil. The Pirahã live along the Maici River, a tributary of the Amazon River.

Pirahã is the only surviving dialect of the Mura language; all others having died out in the last few centuries as most groups of the Mura people have shifted to Portuguese. Suspected relatives, such as Matanawi, are also extinct. Pirahã is estimated to have between 250 and 380 speakers. It is not in immediate danger of extinction, as its use is vigorous and the Pirahã community is mostly monolingual.

The Pirahã language is most notable as the subject of various controversial claims; for example, that it provides evidence for linguistic relativity. The controversy is compounded by the sheer difficulty of learning the language; the number of linguists with field experience in Pirahã is very small.

Phonology

The Pirahã language is one of the phonologically simplest languages known, comparable to Rotokas (New Guinea) and the Lakes Plain languages such as Obokuitai. There is a claim that Pirahã has as few as ten phonemes, one fewer than Rotokas, or even as few as nine for women, but this requires analyzing  as an underlying  and having /h/ invariably substituted for /s/ in female speech. Although such a phenomenon is odd cross-linguistically, Ian Maddieson has found in researching Pirahã data that  does indeed exhibit an unusual distribution in the language.

The 'ten phoneme' claim also does not consider the tones of Pirahã, at least two of which are phonemic (marked by an acute accent and either unmarked or marked by a grave accent in Daniel Everett), bringing the number of phonemes to at least twelve. Sheldon (1988) claims three tones, high (¹), mid (²) and low (³).

Phoneme inventory
When languages have inventories as small and allophonic variation as great as in Pirahã and Rotokas, different linguists may have very different ideas as to the nature of their phonological systems.

Vowels

Consonants
The segmental phonemes are:

  is written .
 Everett posits that  is an allophone of the sequence .

The number of phonemes is at most thirteen, matching Hawaiian, if  is counted as a phoneme and there are just two tones; if  is not phonemic, there are twelve phonemes, one more than the number found in Rotokas, or eleven among women who uniformly replace /s/ with /h/. (English, by comparison, has thirty to forty-five, depending on dialect.) However, many of the phonemes show a great deal of allophonic variation. Also,
  : the nasal  after a pause, the trill  before .
  : the nasal  (an apical alveolar nasal) after a pause;  is a lateral alveolar–linguolabial double flap that has only been reported for this language, where the tongue strikes the upper gum ridge and then strikes the lower lip. However, it is only used in certain special types of speech performances and so might not be considered a normal speech sound.
  : in women's speech,  occurs as  before , and "sometimes" elsewhere.
For many people,  and  may be exchanged in some words.

Because of its variation, Everett states that  is not a stable phoneme.

Lexicon

Pirahã has a few loan words, mainly from Portuguese.

Kinship terms
Everett (2005) says that the Pirahã culture has the simplest known kinship system of any human culture. A single word,  (pronounced ), is used for both mother and father (like English "parent" although Pirahã has no gendered alternative), and they appear not to keep track of relationships any more distant than biological siblings.

Numerals and grammatical number
According to Everett in 1986, Pirahã has words for 'one' and 'two', distinguished only by tone. In his 2005 analysis, however, Everett said that Pirahã has no words for numerals at all, and that  and  actually mean "small quantity" and "larger quantity". Frank et al. (2008) describes two experiments on four Pirahã speakers that were designed to test these two hypotheses. In one, ten spools of thread were placed on a table one at a time and the Pirahã were asked how many were there. All four speakers answered in accordance with the hypothesis that the language has words for 'one' and 'two' in this experiment, uniformly using  for one spool,  for two spools, and a mixture of the second word and 'many' for more than two spools.

The second experiment, however, started with ten spools of thread on the table, and spools were subtracted one at a time. In this experiment, one speaker used  (the word previously supposed to mean 'one') when there were six spools left, and all four speakers used that word consistently when there were as many as three spools left. Though Frank and his colleagues do not attempt to explain their subjects' difference in behavior in these two experiments, they conclude that the two words under investigation "are much more likely to be relative or comparative terms like 'few' or 'fewer' than absolute terms like 'one'".

There is no grammatical distinction between singular and plural, even in pronouns.

A 2012 documentary aired on the Smithsonian Channel reported that a school had been opened for the Pirahã community where they learn Portuguese and mathematics. As a consequence, observations involving concepts like the notion of quantity (which has a singular treatment in Pirahã language), became impossible, because of the influence of the new knowledge on the results.

Color terms
There is also a claim that Pirahã lacks any unique color terminology, being one of the few cultures (mostly in the Amazon basin and New Guinea) that only have specific words for light and dark. Although the Pirahã glossary in Daniel Everett's Ph.D. thesis includes a list of color words (p. 354), Everett (2006) now says that the items listed in this glossary are not in fact words but descriptive phrases (such as "(like) blood" for "red").

Syntax

Pronouns
The basic Pirahã personal pronouns are ti "I, we", gi or gíxai  "you", hi "(s)he, they, this". These can be serially combined: ti gíxai or ti hi to mean "we" (inclusive and exclusive), and gíxai hi to mean "you (plural)", or combined with xogiáagaó 'all', as in "we (all) go".

There are several other pronouns reported, such as 'she', 'it' (animal), 'it' (aquatic animal), and 'it' (inanimate), but these may actually be nouns, and they cannot be used independently the way the three basic pronouns can. The fact that different linguists come up with different lists of such pronouns suggests that they are not basic to the grammar. In two recent papers, Everett cites Sheldon as agreeing with his (Everett's) analysis of the pronouns.

Sheldon (1988) gives the following list of pronouns:

Pronouns are prefixed to the verb, in the order SUBJECT-INDOBJECT-OBJECT where INDOBJECT includes a preposition "to", "for", etc. They may all be omitted, e.g., hi³-ti³-gi¹xai³-bi²i³b-i³ha³i¹ "he will send you to me".

For possession, a pronoun is used in apposition (zero-marking):

Thomason & Everett (2001) note the pronouns are formally close to those of the Tupian languages Nheengatu and Tenharim, which the Mura had once used as contact languages:

Both the Tupian and Pirahã third-person pronouns can be used as demonstratives, as in Pirahã hi xobaaxai ti "I am really smart" (lit. "This one sees well: me"). Given the restricted set of Pirahã phonemes, the Pirahã pronouns ti and gi are what one would expect if the Tupian pronouns were borrowed, and hi differs only in dropping the a.

Verbs
Pirahã is agglutinative, using a large number of affixes to communicate grammatical meaning. Even the 'to be' verbs of existence or equivalence are suffixes in Pirahã. For instance, the Pirahã sentence "there is a paca there" uses just two words; the copula is a suffix on "paca":

Pirahã also uses suffixes that communicate evidentiality, a category lacking in English grammar. One such suffix, -xáagahá, means that the speaker actually observed the event in question:

(The suffix -sai turns a verb into a noun, like English '-ing'.)

Other verbal suffixes indicate that an action is deduced from circumstantial evidence, or based on hearsay. Unlike in English, in Pirahã speakers must state their source of information: they cannot be ambiguous. There are also verbal suffixes that indicate desire to perform an action, frustration in completing an action, or frustration in even starting an action.

There are also a large number of verbal aspects: perfective (completed) vs. imperfective (uncompleted), telic (reaching a goal) vs. atelic, continuing, repeated, and commencing. However, despite this complexity, there appears to be little distinction of transitivity. For example, the same verb, xobai, can mean either 'look' or 'see', and xoab can mean either 'die' or 'kill'.

The verbs are, however, zero-marked, with no grammatical agreement with the arguments of the verb.

According to Sheldon (1988), the Pirahã verb has eight main suffix-slots, and a few sub-slots:
Slot A:
 intensive ba³i¹
 Ø
Slot B:
 causative/incompletive bo³i¹
 causative/completive bo³ga¹
 inchoative/incompletive ho³i¹
 inchoative/completive hoa³ga¹
 future/somewhere a²i³p.
 future/elsewhere a²o³p
 past a²o³b
 Ø
Slot C:
 negative/optative sa³i¹ + C1
 Slot C1:
 preventive ha³xa³
 opinionated ha³
 possible Ø
 positive/optative a³a¹ti³
 negative/indicative hia³b + C2
 positive/indicative Ø + C2
 Slot C2:
 declarative a¹
 probabilistic/certain i³ha³i¹
 probabilistic/uncertain/beginning a³ba³ga³i¹
 probabilistic/uncertain/execution a³ba³i¹
 probabilistic/uncertain/completion a³a¹
 stative i²xi³
 interrogative1/progressive i¹hi¹ai¹
 interrogative2/progressive o¹xoi¹hi¹ai¹
 interrogative1 i¹hi¹
 interrogative2 o¹xoi¹hi¹
 Ø
Slot D:
 continuative xii³g
 repetitive ta³
 Ø
Slot E:
 immediate a¹ha¹
 intentive i³i¹
 Ø
Slot F:
 durative a³b
 Ø
Slot G:
 desiderative so³g
 Ø
Slot H:
 causal ta³i¹o³
 conclusive si³bi³ga³
 emphatic/reiterative koi + H1
 emphatic ko³i¹ + H1
 reiterative i³sa³ + H1
 Ø + H1
 Slot H1:
 present i³hi¹ai³
 past i³xa¹a³ga³
 pastImmediate a³ga³ha¹

These suffixes undergo some phonetic changes depending on context. For instance, the continuative xii³g reduces to ii³g after a consonant, e.g., ai³t-a¹b-xii³g-a¹ → ai³ta¹bii³ga¹ "he is still sleeping".

Also an epenthetic vowel gets inserted between two suffixes if necessary to avoid a consonant-cluster; the vowel is either i³ (before or after s, p, or t) or a³ (other cases), e.g., o³ga³i¹ so³g-sa³i¹ → o³ga³i¹ so³gi³sa³i¹ "he possibly may not want a field".

Conversely, when the junction of two morphemes creates a double vowel (ignoring tones), the vowel with the lower tone is suppressed: si³-ba¹-bo³-ga³-a¹ → si³ba¹bo³ga¹ "he caused the arrow to wound it".

For further details, see Sheldon's 1988 paper.

Embedding

Everett originally claimed that in order to embed one clause within another, the embedded clause is turned into a noun with the -sai suffix seen above:

The examples of embedding were limited to one level of depth, so that to say "He really knows how to talk about making arrows", more than one sentence would be needed.

Everett has also concluded that because Pirahã does not have number-words for counting, does not allow recursive adjective-lists like "the green wealthy hunchbacked able golfer", and does not allow recursive possessives like "The child's friend's mother's house", a Pirahã sentence must have a length limit. This leads to the additional conclusion that there is a finite number of different possible sentences in Pirahã with any given vocabulary.

Everett has also recently reinterpreted even the limited form of embedding in the example above as parataxis. He now states that Pirahã does not admit any embedding at all, not even one level deep. He says that words that appear to form a clause in the example are actually a separate unembedded sentence, which, in context, expresses the same thought that would be expressed by a clause in English. He gives evidence for this based on the lack of specialized words for clause-formation, the pattern of coreferring tokens in the purported clause-constructions, and examples where the purported clause is separated from the rest of the sentence by other complete sentences.

Everett stated that Pirahã cannot say "John's brother's house" but must say, "John has a brother. This brother has a house." in two separate sentences.

According to Everett the statement that Pirahã is a finite language without embedding and without recursion presents a challenge for proposals by Noam Chomsky and others concerning universal grammar—on the grounds that if these proposals are correct, all languages should show evidence of recursive (and similar) grammatical structures.

Chomsky has replied that he considers recursion to be an innate cognitive capacity that is available for use in language but that the capacity may or may not manifest itself in any one particular language.

However, as Everett points out, the language can have recursion in ideas, with some ideas in a story being less important than others. He also mentions a paper from a recursion conference in 2005 describing recursive behaviors in deer as they forage for food. So to him, recursion can be a brain property that humans have developed more than other animals. He points out that the criticism of his conclusions uses his own doctoral thesis to refute his knowledge and conclusions drawn after a subsequent twenty-nine years of research.

Everett's observation that the language does not allow recursion has also been vigorously disputed by other linguists, who call attention to data and arguments from Everett's own previous publications, which interpreted the "-sai" construction as embedding. Everett has responded that his earlier understanding of the language was incomplete and slanted by theoretical bias. He now says that the morpheme -sai attached to the main verb of a clause merely marks the clause as 'old information', and is not a nominalizer at all (or a marker of embedding). More recently, the German linguist Uli Sauerland of the Zentrum für Allgemeine Sprachwissenschaft at Humboldt University (Berlin) has performed a phonetic reanalysis of experimental data in which Pirahã speakers were asked to repeat utterances by Everett. Sauerland reports that these speakers make a tonal distinction in their use of "-sai" that "provides evidence for the existence of complex clauses in Pirahã".

Unusual features of the language

Daniel Everett, over the course of more than two dozen papers and one book about the language, has ascribed various surprising features to the language, including:

Both are reported to be used as phonemes in only this language, but the latter is similar to the sound of blowing a raspberry, known among practically all cultures but not used as a linguistic phoneme. The Pirahã are by now apparently aware of the latter's meaning in other cultures and avoid using the phoneme with foreigners.
 An extremely limited clause structure, not allowing for nested recursive sentences like "Mary said that John thought that Henry was fired".
 No abstract color words other than terms for light and dark (though this is disputed in commentaries by Paul Kay and others on Everett (2005)).
 The entire set of personal pronouns appears to have been borrowed from Nheengatu, a Tupi-based lingua franca. Although there is no documentation of a prior stage of Pirahã, the close resemblance of the Pirahã pronouns to those of Nheengatu makes this hypothesis plausible.
 Pirahã can be whistled, hummed, or encoded in music. In fact, Keren Everett believes that current research on the language misses much of its meaning by paying little attention to the language's prosody. Consonants and vowels may be omitted altogether and the meaning conveyed solely through variations in pitch, stress, and rhythm. She says that mothers teach their children the language through constantly singing the same musical patterns.

Daniel Everett claims that the absence of recursion in the language, if real, falsifies the basic assumption of modern Chomskyan linguistics. This claim is contested by many linguists, who claim that recursion has been observed in Pirahã by Daniel Everett himself, while Everett argues that those utterances that superficially seemed recursive to him at first were misinterpretations caused by his earlier lack of familiarity with the language. Furthermore, some linguists, including Chomsky himself, argue that even if Pirahã lacked recursion, that would have no implications for Chomskyan linguistics.

Pirahã and linguistic relativity

The concept of linguistic relativity postulates a relationship between the language a person speaks and how that person understands the world. The conclusions about the significance of Pirahã numeracy and linguistic relativity in Frank et al. (2008) are quoted below. In short, in this study the Pirahã were – by and large – able to match exact quantities of objects set before them (even larger quantities), but had difficulty matching exact quantities when larger quantities were set before them and then hidden from view before they were asked to match them.

A total lack of exact quantity language did not prevent the Pirahã from accurately performing a task which relied on the exact numerical equivalence of large sets. This evidence argues against the strong Whorfian claim that language for number creates the concept of exact quantity. […] Instead, the case of Pirahã suggests that languages that can express large, exact cardinalities have a more modest effect on the cognition of their speakers: They allow the speakers to remember and compare information about cardinalities accurately across space, time, and changes in modality. […] Thus, the Pirahã understand the concept of one (in spite of having no word for the concept). Additionally, they appear to understand that adding or subtracting one from a set will change the quantity of that set, though the generality of this knowledge is difficult to assess without the ability to label sets of arbitrary cardinality using number words. (emphasis added)

Being concerned that, because of this cultural gap, they were being cheated in trade, the Pirahã people asked Daniel Everett to teach them basic numeracy skills. After eight months of enthusiastic but fruitless daily study with Everett, the Pirahã concluded that they were incapable of learning the material and discontinued the lessons. Not a single Pirahã had learned to count up to ten or even to add 1 + 1.

Everett argues that test-subjects are unable to count for two cultural reasons and one formal linguistic reason. First, they are nomadic hunter-gatherers with nothing to count and hence no need to practice doing so. Second, they have a cultural constraint against generalizing beyond the present, which eliminates number-words. Third, since, according to some researchers, numerals and counting are based on recursion in the language, the absence of recursion in their language entails a lack of counting. That is, it is the lack of need that explains both the lack of counting-ability and the lack of corresponding vocabulary. However, Everett does not claim that the Pirahãs are cognitively incapable of counting.

Knowledge of other languages
Everett states that most of the remaining Pirahã speakers are monolingual, knowing only a few words of Portuguese. The anthropologist Marco Antônio Gonçalves, who lived with the Pirahã for 18 months over several years, writes that "Most men understand Portuguese, though not all of them are able to express themselves in the language. Women have little understanding of Portuguese and never use it as a form of expression. The men developed a contact 'language' allowing them to communicate with regional populations, mixing words from Pirahã, Portuguese and the Amazonian Língua Geral known as Nheengatu."

Everett states that the Pirahã use a very rudimentary Portuguese lexicon with Pirahã grammar when speaking Portuguese and that their Portuguese is so limited to very specific topics that they are rightly called monolingual, without contradicting Gonçalves (since they can communicate on a very narrow range of topics using a very restricted lexicon). Future research on developing bilingualism (Pirahã-Portuguese) in the community, along the lines of Sakel and Gonçalves, will provide valuable data for the discussion on speakers' grammatical competence (e.g. regarding the effect of culture). Although Gonçalves quotes whole stories told by the Pirahã, Everett (2009) claims that the Portuguese in these stories is not a literal transcription of what was said, but a free translation from the pidgin Portuguese of the Pirahã.

In a 2012 study, Jeanette Sakel studied the use of Portuguese by a group of Pirahã speakers and reported that, when speaking Portuguese, most Pirahã speakers employ simple syntactic constructions, but some more proficient speakers utilize constructions that could be analysed as complex constructions, such as subordinating conjunctions and complement clauses.

Notes

References

Bibliography

 Dixon, R. M. W. and Alexandra Aikhenvald, eds., (1999) The Amazonian Languages. Cambridge University Press.
 Everett, D. L. (1992) A Língua Pirahã e a Teoria da Sintaxe: Descrição, Perspectivas e Teoria (The Pirahã Language and Syntactic Theory: Description, Perspectives and Theory). Ph.D. thesis. (in Portuguese). Editora Unicamp, 400 pages; .
 Everett, Daniel, (1986) "Piraha". In the Handbook of Amazonian Languages, vol I. Desmond C. Derbyshire and Geoffrey K. Pullum (eds). Mouton de Gruyter.
 Everett, Daniel (1988) On Metrical Constituent Structure in Piraha Phonology. Natural Language & Linguistic Theory 6: 207–246
Everett, Daniel and Keren Everett (1984) On the Relevance of Syllable Onsets to Stress Placement. Linguistic Inquiry 15: 705–711
Everett, Daniel 2005. Cultural Constraints on Grammar and Cognition in Pirahã: Another Look at the Design Features of Human Language. Current Anthropology 46:621–646
 Keren Everett (1998) Acoustic Correlates of Stress in Pirahã. The Journal of Amazonian Languages: 104–162. (Published version of University of Pittsburgh M.A. thesis.)
 Sauerland, Uli. (2010). "Experimental Evidence for Complex Syntax in Pirahã".
 Sheldon, Steven N. (1974) Some Morphophonemic and Tone Perturbation Rules in Mura-Pirahã. International Journal of American Linguistics, v. 40 279–282.
 Sheldon, Steven N. (1988) Os sufixos verbais Mura-Pirahã (= Mura-Pirahã verbal suffixes). SIL International, Série Lingüística Nº 9, Vol. 2: 147–175 PDF.
 Thomason, Sarah G. and Daniel L. Everett (2001) Pronoun Borrowing. Proceedings of the Berkeley Linguistic Society 27. PDF.
 Michael Frank (2008) "Number as a Cognitive Technology: Evidence from Pirahã Language and Cognition". PDF.

External links

Piraha Alphabet (at Omniglot)
Everett, Daniel. Home page
Pirahã language - by Professor Marco Antonio Gonçalves (UFRJ) in Encyclopedia of Indigenous People in Brazil
Pirahã Dictionary/ Dicionário Mura-Pirahã
Mura-Pirahã Dictionary
Etnolinguistica.Org: discussion list on native South American languages
NPR: Tribe Helps Linguist Argue with Prevailing Theory
Unlocking the Secret Sounds of Language: Life Without Time or Numbers — article in The Independent
Brazil's Pirahã Tribe: Living without Numbers or Time — Spiegel
New Yorker article 'The Interpreter' (abstract)
Audio sample of sung Pirahã — two boys singing about a day's events
BBC Radio 4, The Material World: The Language of the Piraha — Prof. Daniel Everett discusses the linguistic significance of the language with Prof. Ian Roberts.
Daniel Everett: Endangered Languages and Lost Knowledge (video), presentation for the Rosetta Project
Sample1 and Sample2 of Pirahã, spoken by native speakers.
Audio recordings of words lists in Pirahã, spoken by native speakers (UCLA Phonetics Lab Archive).

Agglutinative languages
Muran languages
Whistled languages
Tonal languages